Sybertsville is a community in Sugarloaf Township, Luzerne County, Pennsylvania. It is one mile northwest of Conyngham and six miles west-northwest of Hazleton.

Nescopeck Creek runs west through the area into the Susquehanna River. Route 93 passes through the community. It uses the Sugarloaf zip code of 18251.

Sites
The Holy Dormition Byzantine Franciscan Friary is located in the town.

Notable person
Stephen Decatur Engle, born in Sybertsville in 1837

Notes

Unincorporated communities in Luzerne County, Pennsylvania
Unincorporated communities in Pennsylvania